In the Catholic Church, a religious order is a community of consecrated life with members that profess solemn vows. They are classed as a type of religious institute.

Subcategories of religious orders are:
 canons regular (canons and canonesses regular who recite the Divine Office and serve a church and perhaps a parish);
 monastics (monks or nuns living and working in a monastery and reciting the Divine Office);
 mendicants (friars or religious sisters who live from alms, recite the Divine Office, and, in the case of the men, participate in apostolic activities); and
 clerics regular (priests who take religious vows and have a very active apostolic life).

Original Catholic religious orders of the Middle Ages include the Order of Saint Benedict. In particular the earliest orders include the Poor Ladies (later called the Poor Clares), founded by St. Francis of Assisi in 1212]], English Benedictine Congregation (1216) and Benedictine communities connected to Cluny Abbey, the Benedictine reform movement of Cistercians, and the Norbertine Order of Premonstratensians (1221). These orders were confederations of independent abbeys and priories, who were unified through a leadership structure connected to permanent establishments. 

A century later, mendicant groups like the Carmelites, the Order of Friars Minor, the Dominican Order, the Order of the Most Holy Trinity and the Order of Saint Augustine formed their Orders.  As such, also the Teutonic Order may qualify, as today it is mainly monastic. These Mendicant Orders did not hold property for their Religious Communities, instead begging for alms and going where they were needed. Their leadership structure included each member, as opposed to each Abbey or House, as subject to their direct superior. 

In the past, what distinguished religious orders from other institutes was the classification of the vows that the members took in religious profession as solemn vows. According to this criterion, the last religious order founded was that of the Bethlehem Brothers in 1673. Nevertheless, in the course of the 20th century, some religious institutes outside the category of orders obtained permission to make solemn vows, at least of poverty, thus blurring the distinction.

Essential distinguishing mark 

Solemn vows were originally considered indissoluble. As noted below, dispensations began to be granted in later times, but originally not even the Pope could dispense from them. If for a just cause a member of a religious order was expelled, the vow of chastity remained unchanged and so rendered invalid any attempt at marriage, the vow of obedience obliged in relation, generally, to the bishop rather than to the religious superior, and the vow of poverty was modified to meet the new situation but the expelled religious "could not, for example, will any goods to another; and goods which came to him reverted at his death to his institute or to the Holy See".

Weakening of the distinction in 1917 
The former 1917 Code of Canon Law reserved the name "religious order" for institutes in which the vows were solemn, and used the term religious congregation or simply "congregation" for institutes with simple vows. The members of a religious order for men were called "regulars", those belonging to a religious congregation were simply "religious", a term that applied also to regulars. For women, those with simple vows were called "sisters", with the term "nun" reserved in canon law for those who belonged to an institute of solemn vows, even if in some localities they were allowed to take simple vows instead.

However, it abolished the distinction according to which solemn vows, unlike simple vows, were indissoluble. It recognized no totally indispensable religious vows and thereby abrogated for the Latin Church the special consecration that distinguished "orders" from "congregations", while keeping some juridical distinctions.

In practice, even before 1917 dispensations from solemn religious vows were being obtained by grant of the Pope himself, while departments of the Holy See and superiors specially delegated by it could dispense from simple religious vows.

The 1917 Code maintained a juridical distinction by declaring invalid any marriage attempted by solemnly professed religious or by those with simple vows to which the Holy See had attached the effect of invalidating marriage, while stating that no simple vow rendered a marriage invalid, except in the cases in which the Holy See directed otherwise. Thus members of "orders" were barred absolutely from marriage, and any marriage they attempted was invalid. Those who made simple vows were obliged not to marry, but if they did break their vow, the marriage was considered valid.

Another difference was that a professed religious of solemn vows lost the right to own property and the capacity to acquire temporal goods for themselves, but a professed religious of simple vows, while being prohibited by the vow of poverty from using and administering property, kept ownership and the right to acquire more, unless the constitutions of the religious institute explicitly stated the contrary.

After publication of the 1917 Code, many institutes with simple vows appealed to the Holy See for permission to make solemn vows. The Apostolic Constitution Sponsa Christi of 21 November 1950 made access to that permission easier for nuns (in the strict sense), though not for religious institutes dedicated to apostolic activity. Many of these latter institutes of women then petitioned for the solemn vow of poverty alone. Towards the end of the Second Vatican Council, superiors general of clerical institutes and abbots president of monastic congregations were authorized to permit, for a just cause, their subjects of simple vows who made a reasonable request to renounce their property except for what would be required for their sustenance if they were to depart. These changes resulted in a further blurring of the previously clear distinction between "orders" and "congregations", since institutes that were founded as "congregations" began to have some members who had all three solemn vows or had members that took a solemn vow of poverty and simple vows of chastity and obedience.

Further changes in 1983 
The current 1983 Code of Canon Law maintains the distinction between solemn and simple vows, but no longer makes any distinction between their juridical effects, including the distinction between "orders" and "congregations". Instead, it uses the single term "religious institute" to designate all such institutes.

While solemn vows once meant those taken in what was called a religious order, "today, in order to know when a vow is solemn it will be necessary to refer to the proper law of the institutes of consecrated life."

The Annuario Pontificio continues to distinguish between "Ordini" (Orders) and "Congregazioni Religiose Clericali" (Clerical Religious Congregations).  Some other authors use the terms "religious order" and "religious institute" as synonyms; canon lawyer Nicholas Cafardi, commenting on the fact that the canonical term is "religious institute", write that "religious order" is a colloquialism.

Authority structure 

A religious order is characterized by an authority structure where a superior general has jurisdiction over the order's dependent communities. An exception is the Order of St Benedict which is not a religious order in this technical sense, because it has a system of "independent houses", meaning that each abbey is autonomous. However, the Constitutions governing the order's global "independent houses" and its distinct "congregations" (of which there are twenty) were approved by the pope. Likewise, according to rank and authority, the abbot primate's "position with regard to the other abbots [throughout the world] is to be understood rather from the analogy of a primate in a hierarchy than from that of the general of an order like the Dominicans and Jesuits."

The Canons Regular of Saint Augustine are in a situation similar to that of the Benedictines.  They are organized in eight "congregations", each headed by an "abbot general", but also have an "Abbot Primate of the Confederated Canons Regular of Saint Augustine". And the Cistercians are in thirteen "congregations", each headed by an "abbot general" or an "abbot president", but do not use the title of "abbot primate".

List of religious orders of men in the Annuario Pontificio

The Annuario Pontificio presents the list of male religious institutes in an "Elenco Storio-Giuridico di Precedenza" (Historical-Juridical List of Precedence). This list gives priority to certain types of institutes: Orders (divided into Canons Regular, Monastics, Mendicant Orders, Clerics Regular), Clerical Religious Congregations, Lay Religious Congregations, Eastern Religious Congregations, Secular Institutes, Societies of Apostolic Life. The list is found in the 1964 edition of the Annuario Pontificio, pp. 807–870, where the heading is "States of Perfection (of pontifical right for men)". In the 1969 edition the heading is "Religious and Secular institutes of Pontifical Right for Men", a form it kept until 1975. Since 1976, when work was already advanced on revising the Code of Canon Law, the list has been qualified as "historical-juridical".

Religious orders of women in the Annuario Pontificio

The list of religious institutes for women in the Annuario Pontificio does not distinguish between orders (with solemn vows) and congregations (with simple vows).  Many of the religious orders for men listed above have comparable religious institutes for women with solemn vows.

See also 

 General
Christian monasticism
Christian Religious Profession
Christian Monastic Vows
Provida Mater Ecclesia
Catholic Order Rites
Major Orders (Holy Orders)
Enclosed religious orders
Military religious orders
Secular orders (Third orders)
 Lists
Congregation for Institutes of Consecrated Life and Societies of Apostolic Life
List of Catholic religious institutes
List of military orders
List of Societies of apostolic life

References

External links 
Official websites
 
 

Acronyms and denominations
 

Lists
 
 
 
 
  (searchable directory of men's and women's Catholic religious communities)
  (Comprehensive guide of men's and women's religious communities in the U.S. and Canada with links and vocation opportunities)

Organisation of Catholic religious orders
 
Catholic canonical structures